Lithuania competed at the 2013 World Aquatics Championships in Barcelona, Spain between 20 July to 4 August 2013.

Medalists

Diving

Lithuania qualified 2 quota places for the following diving events.

Men

Swimming

Lithuanian swimmers achieved qualifying standards and was selected by Lithuanian Swimming Federation in the following events (up to a maximum of 2 swimmers in each event at the A-standard entry time, and 1 at the B-standard):

Men

Women

References

External links
Barcelona 2013 Official Site

Nations at the 2013 World Aquatics Championships
2013 in Lithuanian sport
Lithuania at the World Aquatics Championships